Posit or POSIT may refer to:

 Postulate
 Posit (number format), a universal number (unum type III) format since 2016
 POSIT, a computer vision algorithm that performs 3D pose estimation
 Posit Software, PBC (formerly known as RStudio, PBC)

See also
 Postulator, one who guides a cause for Catholic beatification or canonization